Roy Mackenzie Stewart  (1889–1964) was a Scottish neurologist.

After education at Lord Williams's Grammar School at Thame, Oxfordshire, Roy Mackenzie Stewart entered the University of Edinburgh Medical School and graduated there MB ChB (Edin.) in 1911. After serving on the staff of the Lancashire County Asylum at Prestwich, he joined in May 1915 the RAMC and was sent to France, where the explosion of a heavy gun caused him to have tinnitus for the remainder of his life. He was then stationed as a neurologist at Moss Side Military Hospital at Maghull (near Liverpool), from 1917 in 1918 in Salonica, and from May to November 1919 at the Royal Victoria Hospital, Netley. He received in 1920 the M.D. degree from the University of Edinburgh Medical School. In 1920 he became deputy medical superintendent of Whittingham Mental Hospital.

In 1922 Stewart became medical superintendent of Leavesden Mental Hospital. He introduced new standards of medical and nursing care and established regimens of training and treatment that were advanced for the era of the 1920s. The hospital housed about 2,600 patients (mostly severe subnormals with birth defects). He personally examined each patient and personally conducted post-mortem examinations with extensive histological studies. His clinical and necropsy reports were extremely thorough and detailed, so much so that his numerous published articles consisted largely of direct quotations from his routine hospital notes.

Stewart was elected FRCPE in 1929 and FRCP in 1942. He was in 1942 president of the neurology section of the Royal Society of Medicine. He was from 1943 to 1946 chair of the Mental Deficiency Committee and in 1946–1947 chair of the Mental Deficiency Section of the Royal Medico-Psychological Association. He gave in 1947 the Morison lecture on Infantile Cerebral Hemiplegia to the Royal College of Physicians, Edinburgh.

Family
Roy M. Stewart's father was Surgeon Rear-Admiral William Henry Stewart, M.D., deputy inspector general of the Royal Naval Medical Service. In 1923 Roy M. Stewart married Agnes Maud Stirling (1900–1994), daughter of Royal Navy Commander Thomas Willing Stirling (1866–1930), O.B.E. Roy and Agnes Stewart had two daughters and two sons. Their elder son, Desmond Stirling Stewart (1924–1981), was a prolific writer on Middle Eastern history and culture – he wrote over a dozen books, including the Time-Life book Early Islam and a biography of T. E. Lawrence. Their younger son, Thomas H. M. Stewart (b. 1930), became a physician and professor of medicine at the School of Medicine of the University of Ottawa.

Selected publications

with W. R. Ashby: 
with W. R. Ashby:

References

1889 births
1964 deaths
20th-century British medical doctors
British neurologists
Royal Army Medical Corps officers
Fellows of the Royal College of Physicians
Fellows of the Royal College of Physicians of Edinburgh
People educated at Lord Williams's School
Alumni of the University of Edinburgh Medical School